The 2012 Pac-12 Conference football season began on August 30, 2012 with Northern Colorado at Utah. The conference's first game was played on September 15 with #2 USC at #21 Stanford, and the final game played was the Pac-12 Championship Game on November 30, 2012.  This is the second season for the conference as a 12-team league.  Pac-12 champion Stanford was featured in the Rose Bowl, a BCS bowl, when they prevailed 20–14 against Big Ten Champion Wisconsin on January 1, 2013.

Previous season

The first Pac-12 Championship Game was held on Friday, December 2, 2011. Oregon defeated UCLA to claim their third straight conference title.

Last season, seven teams accepted bowl bids, an improvement from the four in the 2010 season. Oregon Ducks, ending the regular season with a program-second twelve wins and with a #5  BCS ranking, earned a berth in the Rose Bowl, where they defeated Wisconsin for their first Rose Bowl win in 95 years. Stanford repeated as the conference runner-up, ending the regular season with a program-first eleven wins (their sole loss was to Oregon) and with a #4 BCS ranking, giving them an at-large BCS berth.  The Cardinal was defeated by Big 12 champion Oklahoma State in the Fiesta Bowl. Arizona lost to Oklahoma State while Washington defeated by Baylor in non-BCS bowls.

Preseason
2012 Pac-12 Spring Football:

North Division 	
 California - Thu., March 15 to Sat., April 21
 Oregon - Tue., April 3 to Sat., April 28
 Oregon State - Mon., March 12 to Sat., April 28
 Stanford - Mon., Feb. 27 to Sat., April 14
 Washington - Mon., April 2 to Sat., April 28
 Washington State - Thu., March 22 to Sat., April 21

South Division 	
 Arizona -   Mon., March 5 to Sat., April 14
 Arizona State - Tue., March 13 to Sat., April 21
 Colorado - Sat., March 10 to Sat., April 14
 UCLA - Tue., April 3 to Sat., May 5
 USC - Tue., March 6 to Sat., April 14 	
 Utah - Wed., March 21 to Sat., April 21

Head coaches

 Rich Rodriguez, Arizona – 1st year
 Todd Graham, Arizona State – 1st year
 Jeff Tedford, California – 6th year
 Jon Embree, Colorado – 2nd year
 Chip Kelly, Oregon – 4th year
 Mike Riley, Oregon State – 11th year
 David Shaw, Stanford – 2nd year
 Jim L. Mora, UCLA – 1st year
 Lane Kiffin, USC – 3rd year
 Kyle Whittingham, Utah – 8th year
 Steve Sarkisian, Washington  – 4th year
 Mike Leach, Washington State – 1st year

Rankings

Schedule

Week 1

Week 2

Week 3

Week 4

Week 5

Week 6

Week 7

Week 8

Week 9

Week 10

Week 11

Week 12

Week 13

Week 14 (Pac-12 Championship Game)

Records against other conferences

Pac-12 vs. BCS matchups

Bowl games
The Pac-12 is participating in the following bowls (Pac-12 teams in bold):

Players of the week
Following each week of games, Pac-12 conference officials select the players of the week from the conference's teams.

Position key

Home game attendance

Oregon State's home game against Nicholls State was postponed due to Nicholls State's inability to travel due to Hurricane Isaac.
Due to reconstruction at Husky Stadium, Washington play their 2012 home games at CenturyLink Field.
This was an official Washington State home game played versus Oregon at CenturyLink Field.

Notes
July 24, 2012 – 2012 Media Day at Gibson Amphitheatre.
September 4, 2012 – After Week 1, UCLA is tied for first in sacks with 6.
September 8, 2012 - Three Pac-12 teams upset ranked opponents: Arizona defeats #18 Oklahoma State, Oregon State prevails over #13 Wisconsin, and UCLA holds off #16 Nebraska.
September 9, 2012 - Five Pac-12 teams are ranked in the Top 25: #2 USC, #4 Oregon, #21 Stanford, #22 UCLA, #24 Arizona.
November 3, 2012 – Oregon is the first team to ever score 60 points on USC in 124 years.
November 8, 2012 – USC was reprimanded and fined by the conference for illegally deflated game balls by a student manager during the Oregon game on November 3, 2012.
 November 20, 2012 – Three days after the close of the season, head coach Jeff Tedford was relieved of his duties at  California.

Awards and honors
Doak Walker Award
 2nd - Johnathan Franklin, UCLA; 3rd - Kenjon Barner, Oregon
Johnny Unitas Golden Arm Award

Maxwell Award

Walter Camp Player of the Year Award

All-Americans
Academic All-America Team Member of the Year (CoSIDA)

AFCA Coaches' All-Americans First Team:

All-Pac-12 teams

Offensive Player of the Year: Marqise Lee, WR, USC
Pat Tillman Defensive Player of the Year:  Will Sutton, DE, Arizona State
Offensive Freshman of the Year: Marcus Mariota, QB, Oregon
Defensive Freshman of the Year: Leonard Williams, DE, USC
Coach of the Year: David Shaw, Stanford

Offense:

Defense:

Specialists:

All-Academic
First team

2013 NFL Draft

References